Hotel Nikko Kaohsiung (Chinese：高雄日航酒店) is a five star hotel located in Cianjhen District, Kaohsiung, Taiwan. The hotel will open in 2023. Hotel Nikko Kaohsiung will be the fourth property of Okura Nikko Hotels to open in Taiwan, following the opening of Hotel Royal Nikko Taipei (1984), The Okura Prestige Taipei (2012) and The Okura Prestige Taichung (planned opening 2022).

Location
The hotel is located at the heart of Kaohsiung's Asia New Bay Area, near Kaohsiung International Airport, Kaohsiung Main Station and Kaohsiung Exhibition Center. It is 4 minutes’ walk from Sanduo Shopping District metro station.

Facilities
It will feature a wide range of restaurants, including Japanese cuisine, Chinese cuisine and all-day dining, and a rooftop bar on the 21st floor where guests can enjoy views of Kaohsiung Harbor. The hotel's facilities aim to meet the diverse needs of guests staying for both business and leisure.

See also
 Nikko Hotels
 InterContinental Kaohsiung
 Kaohsiung Marriott Hotel

References

External links
Official website

2023 establishments in Taiwan
Skyscraper hotels in Kaohsiung
Hotels established in 2023
Hotel buildings completed in 2023